Walter William Jenny Jr. is an attorney and community activist. He and his wife Rose Ann live in Edmond, Oklahoma.

Early life and education
Walter Jenny was born in Shawnee, Oklahoma. He attended Shawnee High School and graduated at the age of 16. His parents are Walter and Eula Mae (Hink) Jenny. He attended the University of Oklahoma where he served three elected terms in the student government's Student Congress. He then transferred to the University of Washington where he graduated in 1978 with a bachelor's degree in political science. He received his juris doctor from the Oklahoma City University School of Law, and received the American Jurisprudence award in administrative law. He later served as a judicial intern under long-time Supreme Court Justice Marion P. Opala.

Jenny was a delegate to the 1980 Democratic National Convention and an unsuccessful candidate for the Oklahoma House of Representatives in 1986. He served as Secretary of the Oklahoma Democratic Party from 2005 to 2009 and was a presidential elector for Barack Obama in Oklahoma in 2008. For several years he wrote a regular column for the Edmond Sun and the Oklahoma Observer and edited the Oklahoma Democratic Party's quarterly publication The Yellow Dog Dispatch.

After passing the Oklahoma bar exam, Jenny practiced labor and employment law in Oklahoma. He became an Assistant Attorney General in 1995, representing a variety of state agencies. He served as general counsel for the Oklahoma Commission on Consumer Credit in 2006-2007 before joining the Oklahoma Department of Labor as Assistant General Counsel. He is also licensed to practice before the Western, Northern and Eastern District federal courts in Oklahoma, and the Tenth Circuit Court of Appeals.

Walter is a member of Tau Kappa Epsilon fraternity, having been Grand Province Advisor from 2000 to 2013 and as District Vice President from 1981 to 1986; he served as chair of the Judiciary Committee, and was appointed to a variety of fraternity committees over the years. He also was Chapter Advisor for Omicron Phi and Epsilon Sigma chapters in Oklahoma. Jenny is recipient of the fraternity's Key Leader award in 2001, and was named International "Volunteer of the Year" in 2005. He was inducted into the TKE Oklahoma Hall of Fame in 2007, and was given the International Grand Prytanis Award at the fraternity's biennial Conclave in 2009.

Jenny was on the Board of Directors of Central Oklahoma Habitat for Humanity from 1987 to 1991, and was chairman during 1990. During that year, the organization's budget doubled and the number of houses built also doubled. In 1980 he served as president of the church council of St. John Lutheran Church in Shawnee. He was elected President of the Board of Directors of the Edmond Neighborhood Alliance, and is a member of the Board of Directors of the Oklahoma YMCA Youth in Government Alumni Association.

See also

Going Against The Grain, Edmond Sun, June 12, 2008

References

Shawnee High School (Oklahoma) alumni
University of Oklahoma alumni
University of Washington College of Arts and Sciences alumni
Oklahoma City University School of Law alumni
Living people
Year of birth missing (living people)